Marco Christian Carducci (born September 24, 1996) is a Canadian professional soccer player who plays as a goalkeeper for Canadian Premier League club Cavalry FC and Canada national team.

Club career

Vancouver Whitecaps FC
Carducci signed his first professional contract with Major League Soccer's Vancouver Whitecaps FC on March 4, 2014. He made his debut on May 7, 2014 in a Canadian Championship fixture against Toronto FC, which Vancouver lost 2–1. After three seasons with the Whitecaps, two of which were on loan to their reserve club Whitecaps FC 2, the Whitecaps announced that Carducci would not return for the 2017 season.

Rio Grande Valley FC Toros
Carducci signed with USL side Rio Grande Valley FC Toros in March 2017.

Calgary Foothills
In February 2018, Carducci would turn down multiple offers from USL clubs to sign with Premier Development League club Calgary Foothills FC, serving as a goalkeeper coach in addition to playing duties. Carducci would help Calgary Foothills to the 2018 PDL Championship, winning the Golden Glove as well as being named to the 2018 PDL All-League Team.

Cavalry FC
Carducci signed for Cavalry FC of the Canadian Premier League in December 2018. Upon signing, he indicated his desire for playing time, and that his goal was to play for Canada in the 2026 World Cup with Canada as one of the three hosts. In the 2019 Canadian Premier League season, the first season in league history, Cavalry began with a seven-game winning streak, with Carducci starting in each, picking up four clean sheets in the process. The streak finally came to an end on June 22, with a 1–0 defeat against Forge FC. Cavalry also saw success in the Canadian Championship, becoming the first Canadian Premier League side to defeat MLS opposition as they defeated the struggling Vancouver Whitecaps FC 2–1 on aggregate in the quarterfinals. Carducci was instrumental in this victory, posting a clean sheet in the first leg and only conceding one goal in the second against his former club. In the semi-finals, however, they were knocked out of the tournament at the hands of the Montreal Impact. Carducci backstopped Cavalry to both the spring and fall championships and a berth to the 2019 Canadian Premier League Finals, where they faced Forge. In the first leg, Carducci was widely praised for his performance as he saved a Tristan Borges penalty to keep the score at zero, but Borges ended up scoring at the very end of the first half and the match ended at 1-0 for Forge. In the second leg, Cavalry was unable to score, and during stoppage time, with all the Cavalry defenders in the attacking zone, Forge players Elimane Cissé and David Choinière ran the length of a field on a 2 on 0, and there was not much Carducci could do to stop it. Choinière scored, and Forge won the championship. Despite losing the championship, Carducci had a good individual season, he finished with 9 clean sheets, tied with Triston Henry for the most in the league. Carducci would win the CPL goalkeeper of the year for the 2019 season.

Cavalry later confirmed that Carducci would return for the 2020 season. In the shortened season Carducci finished with three clean sheets in nine games, as his team finished the season in third place. He extended his contract for the 2021 and 2022 seasons. 

In March 2022, Carducci would announce that he had been diagnosed with testicular cancer the prior month, and was recovery after having surgery to treat the issue shortly after. After serving as the team's backup for the first 3 games of the 2022 season, he would return to the net on May 1, 2022, posting a clean sheet against Pacific FC in his return. After his strong 2022 season with Cavalry, Carducci would win his second Golden Glove award.

International career
Carducci has represented Canada at various youth levels. He was on the Canadian team that went to the 2013 FIFA U-17 World Cup. In May 2014, he was named to the Canadian U-20 team that would participate in the Milk Cup later that summer. He played one game at the tournament, with his Vancouver Whitecaps compatriot Nolan Wirth playing the other two. Carducci would later participate again with the U20s in November, where he played two games against England and Russia in a 2–2 draw and a 2–1 victory, respectively.

In May 2016, Carducci was called to Canada's U23 national team for a pair of friendlies against Guyana and Grenada. Carducci started the second match against Grenada, posting the clean sheet

On August 28, 2019, Carducci was called up to the Canada men's national soccer team for a pair of CONCACAF Nations League matches against Cuba, his first call up as well as the first call up for any Canadian Premier League player.

Career statistics

Club

Honours

Club 
Vancouver Whitecaps FC
Canadian Championship: 2015

Calgary Foothills
PDL Championship: 2018
Calvary FC
Canadian Premier League Finals runners-up: 2019
Canadian Premier League (Regular season) Champions: Spring 2019, Fall 2019

Individual 
CPL Goalkeeper of the Year: 2019, 2022
PDL Goalkeeper of the Year: 2018
Canadian U-17 Player of the Year: 2012, 2013
Canadian Premier League Volkswagen Premier Performer: 2019

References

External links

 
 
 

1996 births
Living people
Association football goalkeepers
Canadian soccer players
Soccer players from Calgary
Canadian sportspeople of Italian descent
Canadian people of Uruguayan descent
Sportspeople of Uruguayan descent
Vancouver Whitecaps FC U-23 players
Vancouver Whitecaps FC players
Whitecaps FC 2 players
Rio Grande Valley FC Toros players
Cavalry FC players
USL League Two players
USL Championship players
Canadian Premier League players
Canada men's youth international soccer players
2015 CONCACAF U-20 Championship players
Canada men's under-23 international soccer players
Homegrown Players (MLS)
Calgary Foothills FC players